Federico Villarreal National University (UNFV) is a public university located in Lima, Peru. It was named in honor of the Peruvian mathematician Federico Villarreal.

History 
It first functioned as a branch of the Community University of the Center - Universidad Comunal del Centro (UCC) based in Huancayo. That same year, the Peruvian geographer, philosopher, historian and politician Javier Pulgar Vidal was commissioned to manage the university. 

The Lima branch of the UCC began its activities in a rented house, located at 262 Moquegua street. The entrance exams were set for the month of August 1960 and classes began on 16 September of the same year.

In 1961, the Community University of the Center was nationalized as the National University of the Center of Peru. Due to the emergence of disagreements with the central headquarters in Junin, Víctor Raúl Haya de la Torre promoted the creation of the Lima branch and thus managed to declare its autonomy in January 1963.

The Federico Villarreal National University was created by Order Nº 14692 on 30 October 1963. The law to create the university was presented by the APRA parliamentary bench, exposed and defended by Luis Alberto Sánchez, and promulgated by Fernando Belaunde Terry.

Organization 
The UNFV is organized into 18 faculties:

 Administration
 Economics
 Health sciences - Hipolito Unanue (loccated near the Hipolito Unanue National Hospital in El Agustino)
 Laws and political sciences
 Education
 Humanities
 Civil engineering
 Industrial and systems engineering

 Geographical, Environmental and Ecotourism Engineering
 Oceanography, Fisheries, Food Sciences and Aquaculture
 Electronic and Computer Engineering
 Natural Sciences and Mathematics
 odontology
 Medical technology
 Psychology

 agricultural sciences,
 engineering sciences 
 architecture
 accounting
 social sciences

Together they are offering 60 bachelor programs, 52 master programs, and 13 doctorates.

Rankings 
Federico Villarreal National University is one of the best public universities of Peru.

In 2021, the Webometrics Ranking of World Universities of the Spanish National Research Council (CSIC) ranked the Federico Villarreal National University in the 27th place in the country, in its ranking.

Notable alumni 
See also Category:Federico Villarreal National University alumni
Laura Bozzo (TV talk show presenter and lawyer)
 Mercedes Cabanillas (educator and politician)
 César Hildebrandt (journalist)
 José Luis Pérez-Albela (doctor-writer, former athlete and lecturer)
 Alejandro Aguinaga (administrator, surgeon and politician)
 Arturo Cavero Velásquez (singer of Creole music)
 José Antonio Chang (industrial engineer, rector and politician)
 Teófilo Cubillas (soccer player, accountant)
 Liliana La Rosa (nurse, university professor and former minister)
 Luis Nava Guibert (lawyer and politician)
 Julián Pérez Huarancca (novelist and short story writer)
 Nidia Vílchez (public and political accountant)
 César Villanueva (administrator and politician)
 José Watanabe (poet)
 Juan Sheput (industrial engineer, politician and university professor)
 Zulema Tomás (doctor, politician and ex health minister)

Cooperations 

 University of Salamanca
 Complutense University of Madrid
 Harvard University - Laspau
 Virginia International University
 National University of Colombia
 Autonomous University of Asunción
 Technical University of Machala 
 Municipal University of Sao Caetano do Sul
 University of Buenos Aires
 University of Seville
 University of La Laguna 
 University of Atlántico

Continuing on the route of internationalization, since 2017, UNFV joined the Compostela Group of Universities.

References

External links
 Official site
 Comunidad UNFV

Federico Villarreal National University
Educational institutions established in 1963
1963 establishments in Peru